Antigyroceras is a genus of nautiloids in the order Discosorida, known from central Asia, that lived during Late Silurian and Early Devonian times. It is contemporary with the discosorid Endoplectoceras

References

 Sepkoski, J.J. Jr. 2002. A compendium of fossil marine animal genera. D.J. Jablonski & M.L. Foote (eds.). Bulletins of American Paleontology 363: 1–560. Sepkoski's Online Genus Database (CEPHALOPODA)
 Antigyroceras in Fossilworks gateway 

Prehistoric nautiloid genera
Silurian first appearances
Early Devonian genus extinctions
Discosorida